FaceTime is a proprietary videotelephony product developed by Apple Inc. FaceTime is available on supported iOS mobile devices running iOS 4 and later and Mac computers that run  and later. FaceTime supports any iOS device with a forward-facing camera and any Mac computer equipped with a FaceTime Camera. FaceTime Audio, an audio-only version, is available on any iOS device that supports iOS 7 or newer, and any Mac with a forward-facing camera running OS X 10.9.2 and later. 

FaceTime is included for free in iOS and macOS from  (10.7) onwards. Since the release of iOS 15, iPadOS 15, and macOS Monterey, non-Apple systems can be used to participate in FaceTime calls using a web client.

History
Apple bought the "FaceTime" name from FaceTime Communications, which changed its name to Actiance in January 2011. On June 7, 2010, Apple CEO Steve Jobs announced FaceTime in conjunction with the iPhone 4 in a keynote speech at the 2010 Apple Worldwide Developers Conference. Support for the fourth generation iPod Touch (the first model of iPod Touch equipped with cameras) was announced in conjunction with the device's release on September 8, 2010. On March 2, 2011, FaceTime support was announced for the newly introduced iPad 2, which had forward- and rear-facing cameras.

On February 24, 2011, FaceTime left beta and was listed in the Mac App Store for US$0.99. Apple claims that it intended to provide the application free of charge, however, a provision of the Sarbanes–Oxley Act (2002) bars companies from providing an unadvertised new feature of an already-sold product without enduring "onerous accounting measures". The US$0.99 beta is no longer available for download from Apple. FaceTime is included for free in macOS from  (10.7) onwards and iOS.

AT&T allowed customers to use FaceTime as long as they were tiered but blocked the application from working for customers with unlimited data plans. They were brought before the Federal Communications Commission (FCC) for net neutrality violations.

In May 2011, it was found that FaceTime would work seamlessly over 3G on all iPhone, iPad, and iPod Touch models that supported it. Even though FaceTime worked only over 3G at that time, it now supports 4G LTE calls on networks all over the world, and availability is limited to operators' GSM plans.

In 2018, Apple added group video and audio support to FaceTime which can support up to 32 people in iOS 12 and macOS Mojave.

On June 7, 2021, during Apple's WWDC Keynote, it was announced that FaceTime will be made available for Android and Windows users via the web. A new feature called SharePlay was announced for FaceTime on iOS 15, iPadOS 15, and macOS Monterey at the same event. It will let users on iPhone, iPad, and Mac share music, video, or their screen with people on the call. Apple stated that the feature uses an API that can be enabled on any media service and SharePlay is slated to support Apple Music, the Apple TV app (including Apple TV+), Disney+, Hulu, HBO Max, Paramount+, TikTok, Twitch, and several other media sources at launch.

Implementation
 

FaceTime works by establishing a connection between two supported devices. Most Apple devices (such as iPhones, iPads, and Macs) introduced after 2011 support FaceTime. FaceTime is currently incompatible with non-Apple devices or any other video calling services. Mac models introduced in 2011 have high-definition video FaceTime, which devices use automatically when both ends have a FaceTime HD camera.

At launch, unlike Mac OS X's iChat, FaceTime did not support group conferencing. The application allowed a one-on-one video chat—only two people could talk at once. If a second user called and the user answered, the video chat with the previous user would end and a new video session began with the second caller. In iPhone, if a phone call was pending and the user attempts to answer, the video call ends and the phone call began with the next user. Support for group video conferencing was added with the release of iOS 12, allowing up to 32 people to participate in a video call simultaneously.

Incoming notifications on iOS devices are shown during a FaceTime call, but if they are opened, the video will be temporarily paused until the user is back in the FaceTime app.

On the iPhone, a user can activate FaceTime during a phone call by pressing the FaceTime button or initiating FaceTime from their call history or the Contacts application. iOS 7 and newer also provide a separate FaceTime app, as there always has been on Apple's non-telephony devices: iPad, iPod Touch, and Mac.

Until the release of iOS 6, FaceTime required a WiFi connection to work. From iOS 6 onwards, FaceTime for the iPhone and iPad has supported FaceTime calls over cellular networks (3G or LTE) provided the carrier enabled it, which by mid-2013 virtually all carriers worldwide have allowed. FaceTime Audio uses about three megabytes of data for every five minutes of conversation, with FaceTime Video uses significantly more. Cellular talk time/minutes are not used after switching from a voice call to a FaceTime call.

FaceTime calls can be placed from supported devices to any phone number or email address that is registered to the FaceTime service. A single email address can be registered to multiple devices and a call placed to that address rings all devices simultaneously.

Standards
The FaceTime protocol is based on numerous open industry standards but is not interoperable with non-Apple products. FaceTime's lack of interoperability makes customers dependent on Apple and unable to switch away from Apple products.

Upon the launch of the iPhone 4, Jobs stated that Apple would immediately start working with standards bodies to make the FaceTime protocol an "open industry standard". While the protocols are open standards, Apple's FaceTime service requires a client-side certificate.

FaceTime calls are protected by end-to-end encryption so that only the sender and receiver can access them. Apple cannot decrypt this data.

Standards used include:
 H.264 and AAC-ELD – video and audio codecs respectively.
 SIP – IETF signaling protocol for VoIP.
 STUN, TURN, and ICE – IETF technologies for traversing firewalls and NAT.
 RTP and SRTP – IETF standards for delivering real-time and encrypted media streams for VoIP.

Compared to most SIP implementations, Facetime adds techniques that enhance performance at the cost of breaking interoperability: port multiplexing, SDP minimization, and SDP compression.

FaceTime Audio
A new audio-only version of FaceTime, named FaceTime Audio, was announced during the annual Apple Worldwide Developers Conference (WWDC) keynote speech on June 10, 2013, and released with iOS 7 on September 18, 2013. As an audio-only version of FaceTime, it effectively makes the protocol into a voice-over-Internet Protocol (VoIP), that competes with other mainstream providers in the field, including Skype (Microsoft).

Based on the same AAC-LD audio protocol, the service provides high-quality audio. The iOS 7 betas limited FaceTime Audio to calls placed on a Wi-Fi network (the same original limitation of the video version of FaceTime), but the final release has removed that restriction to allow it to work over 3G and LTE data connections, as is the case with most carriers and plans about FaceTime with video. Like the video version, FaceTime Audio is currently only available between Apple devices on iOS 7 and later. FaceTime streaming over cellular data is unavailable for the iPhone 4 and the iPad 2.

Walkie-Talkie 
Walkie-Talkie is a limited FaceTime Audio-based communication feature made available on September 17, 2018, for Apple Watch devices running watchOS 5.0 or later. The application allows users to have two-person calls similar to using a real walkie-talkie, as conversations are push-to-talk and only one end of the conversation can speak at a time. Walkie-Talkie is intended for short and quick messages between two people rather than long conversations which are better suited for traditional phone or video calls. Users can set their availability for walkie-talkie through the control panel or in the app itself, which allows friends to start a call at any time. 

In July 2019, Apple temporarily disabled the Walkie-Talkie feature from all Apple Watches after a vulnerability was discovered that allowed a user to listen to another person's iPhone without consent.

Limited availability

By country
, FaceTime was not enabled on devices bought in the United Arab Emirates possibly due to regulations in this country that restrict IP-based communications. FaceTime is made available for iPhones in the United Arab Emirates upon updating iOS 13.6. In addition, iPhone and iPad (Cellular models) devices bought in mainland China have FaceTime Audio, Group FaceTime, and the ability to create and join FaceTime links via the FaceTime app disabled, while FaceTime Video is available. Devices bought outside these countries support both video and audio versions of FaceTime. Although Egypt, Jordan, Qatar, and Kuwait originally disabled FaceTime on the iPhone 4, they later re-enabled the feature through a carrier update for existing phone owners and made it pre-enabled on any newly purchased iPhone. In March 2018, FaceTime was made available for iPhones in Saudi Arabia upon updating to iOS 11.3, and in August 2019, FaceTime was made available for iPhones in Pakistan upon updating to iOS 12.4.

By iOS version
As of April 16, 2014, FaceTime ceased working on earlier versions of iOS that had previously supported it (iOS 4 and later), due to the client-side certificate used to authenticate a genuine Apple device with FaceTime servers (amongst other uses) expiring on that date. Apple chose not to release an update to this certificate for all devices for which a newer major iOS version (with a new, valid certificate) was available. Apple did release a minor update, to the certificate only, for all OS X versions which could run FaceTime, and also for the 4th generation iPod Touch, the only iOS device which could run FaceTime but could not run the then-latest iOS 7. The result of this policy was that almost all iOS users had to update the iOS version on their devices if they wished to continue using FaceTime.

Controversy

Group FaceTime bug 
On January 28, 2019, a bug was discovered in the FaceTime app that allowed users to eavesdrop on other users without their knowledge through an exploit. It was later discovered the video feed could be enabled without the other users' acceptance. Apple said in a statement that it would release a fix for the exploit shortly, disabling Group FaceTime for the time being. The bug was named "FacePalm" by security researchers, and affects iOS devices running FaceTime on iOS 12.1 or Mac computers running macOS Mojave 10.14.1. On February 7, Apple fixed the FaceTime vulnerabilities in iOS 12.1.4 and a Supplemental Update for macOS Mojave 10.14.3.

Although the bug gained international attention on January 28, 2019, the bug was found much earlier by Arizona high school student Grant Thompson. He and his mother tried for more than a week to warn Apple about the problem through Facebook and Twitter after discovering the bug on January 20, without receiving answers.

References

External links
 

Videotelephony
Assistive technology
IOS
IOS software
2010 software
Computer-related introductions in 2010
IOS-based software made by Apple Inc.